The Fischer House is a historic mansion in downtown Austin, Texas, United States, completed in 1882. Its builder, Joseph Fischer, was a prominent mason in Austin at the time, and its bold high Victorian era, Italianate architecture and ornamentation reflect his family's skill in the trade.

The home is located at 1008 West Avenue. It was listed on the National Register of Historic Places on December 16, 1982. The house is also a City of Austin Historic Landmark and is listed as the Burlage - Fischer House on that register.

References

National Register of Historic Places in Austin, Texas
Houses in Austin, Texas
Italianate architecture in Texas
Houses completed in 1882
Houses on the National Register of Historic Places in Texas
Recorded Texas Historic Landmarks
City of Austin Historic Landmarks